KAYS (1400 AM) is a radio station airing an oldies format of songs from the 1950s to the 1980s, based in Hays, Kansas, United States.  It is owned by Eagle Communications Inc.

Eagle Communications owns 28 radio stations in Kansas, Missouri and Nebraska and provides broadband Internet, cable television and telephone services in 29 Kansas communities and Wray, Colorado. Eagle's corporate offices are also in Hays, Kansas.

One of the oldest radio stations in western Kansas, KAYS-AM first signed on the air in 1948.

References

External links
Official website

Oldies radio stations in the United States
Radio stations established in 1948
AYS
1948 establishments in Kansas